Benjamin Youngs Prime (December 20, 1733 – October 31, 1791) was an American poet, essayist, and songwriter.

Prime was born on Long Island to noted American Patriot and pastor Ebenezer and Experience (née Youngs) Prime. He graduated from the College of New Jersey in 1751; he matriculated June 12, 1764, at the University of Leiden in the Netherlands and took his medical degree at the same University July 7, 1764. The title description of his thesis is:  - Lugduni Batavorum : Apud Theodorum Haak, 1764. - 46 p. ; 24 cm 
He wrote essays in Hebrew, Greek, Latin, French, and Spanish, and many songs and ballads which were very popular during the American Revolutionary War. Among his publications are The Patriot Muse, or Poems on Some of the Principal Events of the Late War, by an American; Columbia's Glory, or British Pride Humbled; A Poem on the American Revolution; Muscipula Cambryomachia.

References

This article incorporates text from the International Cyclopedia of 1890, a publication now in the public domain.

American male poets
American male songwriters
American essayists
Princeton University alumni
Leiden University alumni
1733 births
1791 deaths
18th-century American poets
18th-century American male writers
Poets from New York (state)
American male essayists
18th-century essayists
18th-century Latin-language writers
American writers in Latin